TACA Flight 390 was a scheduled flight on May 30, 2008, by TACA International from San Salvador, El Salvador, to Miami, Florida, United States, with intermediate stops at Tegucigalpa and San Pedro Sula in Honduras. The aircraft, an Airbus A320-233, overran the runway after landing at Tegucigalpa's Toncontín International Airport and rolled out into a street, crashing into an embankment and smashing several cars in the process.

Aircraft and crew 

The aircraft was an Airbus A320-233 (registration EI-TAF, c/n 1374). It was built in 2000 and entered service with TACA in 2001. The aircraft was leased twice to Cubana de Avación and Martinair in 2001 and 2007 respectively.

The flight crew included Salvadorans Captain Cesare Edoardo D'Antonio Mena  (40) and First Officer Juan Rodolfo Artero Arevalo (26). All cabin crew members operating on the flight were Hondurans. Captain D'Antonio had 11,899 flight hours, including 8,514 hours on the Airbus A320, and first officer Artero had 1,607 hours with 250 of them on the Airbus A320. Both pilots had previously experience in landing at Toncontín International Airport; captain D'Antonio had landed at the airport 52 times, and first officer Artero had landed there 5 times.

Accident 
Flight 390 departed from San Salvador at 9:05 local time. At 09:40, the flight landed on runway 02 at Toncontín International Airport.

Passengers
The passengers consisted of:

A list of passengers was provided in the fifth press release on the crash from TACA international. This list was in the Spanish and English sections.

Five people died as a result of the accident, including Captain D'Antonio. Ambassador Fraser Neele sustained injuries in the crash. The former head of the Honduran armed forces was also injured. There were two fatalities on the ground, one a taxi driver, in one of three vehicles crushed on the street by the aircraft. One of the survivors said that the business class passengers sustained the most serious injuries.

Investigation
Honduran authorities delegated the investigation of the accident to the Civil Aviation Authority of El Salvador as per the Convention on International Civil Aviation. The accident report stated that the airplane had landed with a  tailwind,  from the displaced approach end of the runway. Since this was the first intermediate stop on a long transcontinental flight, the aircraft was near its upper landing-weight limit (63.5t vs. 64.5t maximum allowable). In addition, the runway was wet, due to the passage of Tropical Storm Alma.

The Aviation Herald retrieved a copy of the final report in 2017. The report itself has not been made public. The Civil Aviation Authority concluded the cause of the accident was the flight crew's inappropriate decision to continue the landing despite not assessing the conditions of the runway, which did not follow standard operating procedures.

See also

List of accidents and incidents involving the Airbus A320 family
TAM Airlines Flight 3054

References

External links
 Civil Aviation Authority
Preliminary Report (Archive)
Index of related files (Archive)
 
 "Accident at Tegucigalpa (Honduras)." (Archive) Bureau of Enquiry and Analysis for Civil Aviation Safety
 "Flight Recorder Group Meeting Report" (Archive Alternate archive) from the National Transportation Safety Board Vehicle Recorder Division, June 5, 2008
 Fatal crash at Honduran airport BBC News 31 May 2008

Airliner accidents and incidents caused by weather
Airliner accidents and incidents caused by pilot error
Aviation accidents and incidents in 2008
Airliner accidents and incidents involving runway overruns
Accidents and incidents involving the Airbus A320
Aviation accidents and incidents in Honduras
2008 in Honduras
Avianca El Salvador accidents and incidents
May 2008 events in South America
2008 meteorology